In combinatorial mathematics, the labelled enumeration theorem is the counterpart of the Pólya enumeration theorem for the labelled case, where we have a set of labelled objects given by an exponential generating function (EGF) g(z) which are being distributed into n slots and a permutation group G which permutes the slots, thus creating equivalence classes of configurations. There is a special re-labelling operation that re-labels the objects in the slots, assigning labels from 1 to k, where k is the total number of nodes, i.e. the sum of the number of nodes of the individual objects. The EGF  of the number of different configurations under this re-labelling process is given by

In particular, if G is the symmetric group of order n (hence, |G| = n!), the functions  can be further combined into a single generating function:

which is exponential w.r.t. the variable z and ordinary w.r.t. the variable t.

The re-labelling process 

We assume that an object  of size  represented by  contains  labelled internal nodes, with the labels going from 1 to m. The action of G on the slots is greatly simplified compared to the unlabelled case, because the labels distinguish the objects in the slots, and the orbits under G all have the same size . (The EGF g(z) may not include objects of size zero. As mentioned, the nodes of the objects are re-labelled when they are distributed into the slots. Say an object of size  goes into the first slot, an object of size  into the second slot, and so on, and the total size of the configuration is k, so that

The re-labelling process works as follows: choose one of

partitions of the set of k labels into subsets of size 
Now re-label the internal nodes of each object using the labels from the respective subset, preserving the order of the labels. E.g. if the first object contains four nodes labelled from 1 to 4 and the set of labels chosen for this object is {2, 5, 6, 10}, then node 1 receives the label 2, node 2, the label 5, node 3, the label 6 and node 4, the label 10. In this way the labels on the objects induce a unique labelling using the labels from the subset of  chosen for the object.

Proof of the theorem 

It follows from the re-labelling construction that there are

or

different configurations of total size k. The conclusion is that the EGF of the labelled configurations is given by

Finally note that every sequence belongs to an orbit of size , hence the generating function of the orbits is given by

References
 François Bergeron, Gilbert Labelle, Pierre Leroux, Théorie des espèces et combinatoire des structures arborescentes, LaCIM, Montréal (1994). English version: Combinatorial Species and Tree-like Structures, Cambridge University Press (1998).

Enumerative combinatorics
Theorems in combinatorics
Articles containing proofs